The John M. Rorex House is a historic house in Maryville, Tennessee, U.S.. It was built circa 1875 for John M. Rorex, a farmer. It was designed in the Italianate architectural style. It was purchased by Mary Armstrong in 1902, and by the Kimbroughs in 1953. It has been listed on the National Register of Historic Places since July 25, 1989.

References

Houses on the National Register of Historic Places in Tennessee
Italianate architecture in Tennessee
Houses completed in 1875
Buildings and structures in Blount County, Tennessee